Perros-Guirec is a commune in the department of Côtes-d'Armor in Brittany. It has been a seaside resort since the end of the 19th century.

Geography

Climate
Perros-Guirec has an oceanic climate (Köppen climate classification Cfb).

Breton language 
In 2008, 4.79% of primary school children attended bilingual schools.

Tourism 
Perros-Guirec is a seaside resort, with sandy beaches and water and beach sports. It is known for its pink granite rocks which have been sculpted by the sea into varied shapes and patterns. There are three large sandy beaches suitable for families: Trestraou beach is suitable for swimming, sunbathing as well as surfing, as it is sheltered and receives full sunshine; Trestrignel beach is wilder and more exposed to the wind; Saint-Guirec beach is smaller and even more picturesque with the presence of the Costaeres Castle on its island in front of it.

Perros-Guirec has a number of seafront villas and manors, many of which are built with pink granite extracted locally.

Economy 
Perros-Guirec's economy is largely based on tourism but benefits also from its proximity to Lannion technopole. 
The nearby Grand Isle, separated from the mainland by a narrow channel, was once famous for its granite quarrying industry. The rock was transported from the island by boat, and was used in the construction of many imposing buildings in Paris.

International relations 
Perros-Guirec is twinned with :
  Teignmouth in Devon in the southwest of England.
  Barr, Bas-Rhin, France
  Quintin, France

People 

Inhabitants of Perros-Guirec are called Perrosiens in French.

Perros-Guirec was long attended by men of letters and artists, for instance the painter Maurice Denis, owner of a villa in Trestrignel ("Never the nature seemed to me more beautiful than in Perros"), writers Anatole Le Braz, Charles Le Goffic, or Ernest Renan who was behind the idea of the construction of the Grand Hotel in Trestraou, to name a few. 
Joseph Conrad lived here for several years and wrote many of his most famous maritime books during that period.

Cultural references 
Perros-Guirec is where, in Gaston Leroux's The Phantom of the Opera, a teenage Vicomte de Chagny retrieves young Christine Daaé's scarf from the sea. It is also the final resting place of her father, where The Phantom plays The Resurrection Of Lazarus on her father's violin for her.

See also 
 Communes of the Côtes-d'Armor department
 Jentilez (Sept-Îles)
 Ploumanac'h Lighthouse
 Sept-Îles Lighthouse

References

External links 

 Official website 
 

Communes of Côtes-d'Armor
Seaside resorts in France